Lenny Lacroix (born 6 February 2003) is a French professional footballer who plays as a centre-back for Portuguese side Benfica B.

Professional career
A youth product of Strasbourg, Mulhouse, Metz, Lacroix signed his first professional contract with Metz on 18 December 2019. He made his professional debut with Metz in a 1-0 Ligue 1 win over Reims on 16 January 2022.

International career
Lacroix is a youth international for France, having represented the France U16s, U17s, and U19s.

Honours
Benfica
Under-20 Intercontinental Cup: 2022

References

External links
 
 FFF Profile
 FC Metz Profile

2003 births
Living people
Footballers from Strasbourg
French footballers
Association football defenders
Ligue 1 players
Championnat National 2 players
Championnat National 3 players
FC Metz players
S.L. Benfica B players
French expatriate footballers
Expatriate footballers in Portugal
French expatriate sportspeople in Portugal